Cornell Hess is a South African rugby union player for Angoulême in the Pro D2 in France. His usual position is lock.

Career

Blue Bulls

He made his first team debut for the Blue Bulls in the opening game of the 2010 Vodacom Cup, coming on as a substitute in their game against . He made a total of 28 appearances in this competition over the next three seasons and finally made his Currie Cup debut in the 2012 Currie Cup Premier Division.

Griquas

He joined  for the 2014 season, but failed to make an appearance for the Kimberley-based side.

Eastern Province Kings

In January 2015, Hess had a trial spell with Port Elizabeth-based side the  prior to the 2015 season. Following the trial, he was offered a contract for the duration of the 2015 Vodacom Cup competition.

References

South African rugby union players
Living people
1989 births
Blue Bulls players
Rugby union locks
South Africa Under-20 international rugby union players
Southern Kings players
Rugby union players from Cape Town